Juupajoki is a municipality of Finland. It is located in the Pirkanmaa region. Korkeakoski is the administrative center of the municipality.

Neighbouring municipalities are Jämsä, Mänttä-Vilppula, Orivesi and Ruovesi.

The municipality is unilingually Finnish.

People
 Kauko Helovirta (1924–1997)
 Jaakko Syrjä (1926–2022)

Gallery

See also
 Finnish national road 58

References

External links

Municipality of Juupajoki – Official website 

Municipalities of Pirkanmaa
Populated places established in 1913
1913 establishments in Finland